Halfway is an unincorporated community in Sublette County, Wyoming, United States.

Name
The exact origin of the name "Halfway" is unknown, but has two possible origins; its location between North and South Cottonwood Creeks or from two residents who had moved to the community from Halfway, Missouri.

History
A post office called Halfway was established in 1903, and remained in operation until 1948.
 The community also had the Cottonwood School named for the nearby creeks.

References

Unincorporated communities in Sublette County, Wyoming